Clifford is a former unincorporated community in northwestern Williamson County, Illinois. It is a former early 20th century mining settlement that has almost disappeared since the closing of local mines.

A post office was established on 26 January 1905, and it remained in operation until after 1931.

The population in 1958 was listed as 300.

References

External links
Clifford Maps, Facts & Features: illinois.hometownlocator.com, retrieved 22 Feb 2011.

Unincorporated communities in Williamson County, Illinois
Unincorporated communities in Illinois
Populated places established in 1905
1905 establishments in Illinois